Hillsborough is a census-designated place (CDP) in the center of Hillsborough Township, Somerset County, New Jersey, United States. It was first listed as a CDP prior to the 2020 census.

The CDP is in south-central Somerset County and is bordered to the northwest by Flagtown, to the west by Neshanic, and to the south by Belle Mead. U.S. Route 206 passes through the community, leading north  to Somerville, the county seat, and south  to Princeton.

Demographics

References 

Census-designated places in Somerset County, New Jersey
Census-designated places in New Jersey
Hillsborough Township, New Jersey